Zacha is a surname. Notable people with the surname include:

Bill Zacha (1920–1998), American artist and entrepreneur
Pavel Zacha (born 1997), Czech ice hockey player

See also
 Tacha
 Zach (surname)
 Zache

Surnames from given names